is a Japanese professional footballer who plays as a midfielder for Indonesian club PS Barito Putera.

Career
Born in Funabashi, Chiba, Noma played in Japan with Aomori Yamada High School from 2008 to 2010, and with the Meiji University team, between 2010 and 2013. In 2014, he moved abroad to Europe and signed with Montenegrin First League side FK Rudar Pljevlja. He stayed in Pljevlja for 3 years, having won the championship in 2014–15, Montenegrin Cup in 2016, and played with Rudar in 2016–17 UEFA Europa League.

During the winter break of the 2016–17 season, he was bought by Serbian club FK Radnički Niš.

In March 2021, Noma joined FC Istiklol on trial, signing a one-year contract with the club on 29 March 2021. Noma scored his first goal for Istiklol on 21 June 2021, in a 4–1 victory over Khujand, which also happened to be Istiklol's 800th league goal.

Career statistics

Honours
Rudar Pljevlja
Montenegrin First League: 2014–15
Montenegrin Cup: 2016
Istiklol
 Tajikistan Higher League: 2021
 Tajik Supercup: 2021

References

1991 births
Living people
People from Funabashi
Japanese footballers
Japanese expatriate footballers
Japanese expatriate sportspeople in Serbia
Japanese expatriate sportspeople in Montenegro
Japanese expatriate sportspeople in Russia
Association football midfielders
FK Rudar Pljevlja players
Montenegrin First League players
Expatriate footballers in Montenegro
FK Radnički Niš players
FC SKA-Khabarovsk players
Serbian SuperLiga players
FC Istiklol players
Tajikistan Higher League players
Expatriate footballers in Serbia
Expatriate footballers in Russia